Hasselblad Masters Award is an bi-annual award granted by the camera company Hasselblad to selected photographers each year across various specialties in recognition of exceptional accomplishment through photography. While its sister prize, the Hasselblad Award, is managed by the Hasselblad Foundation, the Hasselblad Masters Award and its book publishing and touring exhibition projects are overseen directly by the company's senior executive committee.

Overview
"The Hasselblad Masters Award is among the most prestigious in the industry, honoring the best in both established and rising photographic talent." Entries are usually invited the month of May in the previous, and the finalist as announced late in the year, subsequently the winners are announced in the month of January. The jury for the award includes many of the most prominent names in photography, including photographers, editors, agents, and publishers. Categories for the selected photographers include Fine Art, Nature/Landscape, Portrait, Fashion, Editorial, Product, Architecture, Social/Wedding, and General Photography. Each year since 2008 the jury has also selected an "upcoming talent" for an emerging photographer who has rapidly gained the attention of the art and advertising community.

Starting 2014, photographs both in medium format and 35mm-type DSLRs (minimum 16 megapixel) were allowed. new category "Underwater" was added and the former "Up & Coming" category was converted "Project/21" category, wherein  amateurs, students, assistants and young professionals who are 21 years old or younger could enter.

Book and exhibition
The winners are  provided with Hasselblad equipment for their projects as a part of the Masters Book for the year. The selected Hasselblad Masters each create a chapter of original images for the year's Hasselblad Masters Book, a large-format book from TeNeues. The images created for the Hasselblad Masters book are reproduced in large-format fine art prints for exhibition in cities around the world. Recent locations have included London, Hamburg, New York, Bogota, and Hong Kong.

Hasselblad Masters Award recipients

Sources
 2014 Masters Jury
https://www.hasselblad.com/press/press-releases/hasselblad-announces-winners-of-masters-awards-2018/

References

External links
 Hasselblad Masters website

Photography awards
Awards established in 2001